Babu Namboothiri (born 12 August 1947) is a retired Chemistry Professor and Head Of Department of Deva Mata College Kuravilangad and an Indian film and TV actor who has starred in more than 100 Malayalam films and various serials. He is famous for his villain and character roles, best known for his portrayal Thangal, in Thoovanathumbikal (1987), as the primary antagonist, Ajith, in Nirakkoottu (1985), the devious advocate in Jagratha, among many others, and in Cheriya Lokavum Valiya Manushyarum as Madhava Menon, an evil businessman and drug-dealer.

Background
Babu Namboothiri was the eldest among the ten children of Neelakandan Namboothiri and Saraswathi at Mannakkanad, near Kuravilangad, Kottayam. He belongs to Padinjare Mana in Mannakkanad. He performs rituals at Chirayil Ganapathi Temple and has 7 brothers and 2 sisters. He graduated from Sree Sankara College and pursued Masters in Science from SRM College Rewa in Madhya Pradesh. His debut movie was Yaagam in 1982. He is a retired Chemistry Professor of Deva Matha College, Kuravilangad. He is married to Kumari Antharjanam and has three daughters.

Acting
Considered as a great supporting actor who could display a wide range of emotions, he has been a part of many masterpieces and have taken on many character and antagonistic roles which have become very famous.

Filmography

 2017 Sopanam (Short film) as Shankara Poduval
2015 Mylanchi Monchulla Veedu as Krishnan Vaidyer
 2014 RajadhiRaja
 2014 Avatharam as Sree Rama Krishna Moorthy a.k.a. SRK and Moorthy Sir
 2013 Sringaravelan as Ayappan,a fashion Weaver,Kannan's Father
 2013 Kaliyachan 
 2013 Hotel California as Koshi
 2013 Kutteem Kolum
 2013 Trivandrum Lodge
 2013 Dolls as Pisharadi
 2012 The Filmstaar as Swamy
 2012 MLA Mani: Patham Classum Gusthiyum
 2012 Thiruvambadi Thamban
 2011 Maharaja Talkies as Raghavan Nair
 2011 Indian Rupee 
 2011 Nadakame Ulakam
 2010 Aathmakatha
 2010 Aagathan as Dr. Unnithan
 2010 Shikkar
 2009 Evidam Swargamanu
 2009 Kerala Cafe (segment "Nostalgia")
 2009 Swapnamaalika
 2008 Twenty:20 as Justice Kaimal 
 2008 College Kumaran as Kumaran's Father
 2008 Bullet
 2008 Innathe Chintha Vishayam as Premila's Father
 2007 Nasrani as Varghese 
 2007 Vinodayathra as Ramanunni,Vinod's Father
 2007 Detective as Prabhakaran Thampi 
 2007 Aanandabhairavi
 2007 Naalu Pennungal
 2006 Yes Your Honour
 2006 Prajapathi
 2006 Vadakkumnadhan as Govinda Pisharadi 
 2005 Pauran  as Chacko, Geethu Mohandas's father
 2005 Mayookham 
 2005 Bus Conductor
 2004 Perumazhakkalam as Mani Swamy 
 2003 Swantham Maalavika
 2002 Kanmashi as Paramu 
 2002 Sivam as Sarvodayam Kumar 
 2002 Valkannadi as Kunjuraman 
 2002 Pakalppooram
 2002 Neelakaasham Niraye 
 2002 Kanalkkireedam
 2001 Ee Parakkum Thalika as Krishna Pillai/Krishnettan
 2001 Praja
 2001 Ee Nadu Innalevare as Thrikkothu Vaidyar 
 2000 Dada Sahib as Shekharan 
 2000 Shayanam
 2000 Snehadoothu
 1999 Pathram as Warrier 
 1999 Stalin Sivadas as  MAdhavan Nair
 1998 The Truth 
 1998 Elavamkodu Desam as Raru Aasan 
 1998 Pootthiruvaathira Raavil 
 1997 Janathipathyam as Bhattathirippadu
 1997 Adivaram 
 1996 Kathapurushan as Veluchar 
 1995 Sargavasantham
 1995 Aadyathe Kanmani as Raghavan Nair 
 1994 Vidheyan as Yusuf Picha 
 1994 CID Unnikrishnan B.A., B.Ed.
 1993 Dhruvam as Ponmani 
 1993 Ammayane Sathyam as Parvathi's Father 
 1993 Customs Diary as Padmanabha Iyer 
 1993 Kavadiyattam as Raman Nair 
 1992 Ayalathe Adheham as  David Gomez 
 1992 Cheppadividya as Geevarghese Achan 
 1992 Oottyppattanam as Surya Nampoothiri 
 1992 Utsavamelam
 1992 Congratulations Miss Anitha Menon 
 1991 Aparahnam as School Principal 
 1991 Koodikazhca as Mathachan 
 1991 Perumthachan
 1991 Arangu
 1991 Dhanam
 1991 Georgootty C/O Georgootty
 1991 Aavanikunnile Kinnaripookkal
 1990 Ee Thanutha Veluppan Kalathu as Justice T. Vasudev 
 1990 Kuttettan
 1990 Mathilukal 
 1990 Varthamana Kalam as Shekhara Pillai
 1990 Vachanam
 1990 Vembanaad 
 1990 Cheriya Lokavum Valiya Manushyarum
 1990 Nanma Niranjavan Sreenivasan 
 1989 Jagratha as Adv. Janardanan Nair 
 1989 Adikkurippu  as Public Prosecutor 
 1989 Naduvazhikal as Abraham Varkey 
 1988 Mukthi as Pillai 
 1988 Dhinarathrangal as Thomachan 
 1988 Moonnam Mura as Mohan 
 1988 Kanakaambarangal
 1988 Puraavrutham
 1987 Thaniyavarthanam
 1987 Amrutham Gamaya as Ilethu 
 1987 Ezhuthapurangal as Binoy Chandy 
 1987 Jaalakam as Gopinathan 
 1987 Thoovanathumbikal as Thangal
 1987 Chanthayil Choodi Vilkkunna Pennu 
 1987 Theertham
 1987 Swathi Thirunal
 1986 Nyayavidhi as Maharshi Mathews
 1986 Adiverukal
 1985 Samaantharam 
 1985 Nirakkoottu as Ajith
 1984 Guruvayoor Maahathmyam
 1983 Veena Poovu
 1983 Omanathinkal
 1983 Ashtapadi 
 1982 Gaanam 
 1982 Yagam (1982 film)

Television

References

http://cinidiary.com/peopleinfo.php?sletter=B&pigsection=Actor&picata=1
http://entertainment.oneindia.in/celebs/babu-namboodiri.html

External links

Babu Namboothiri at MSI

Indian male film actors
Male actors from Kottayam
Male actors in Malayalam cinema
20th-century Indian male actors
21st-century Indian male actors
Indian male television actors
Male actors in Malayalam television
1947 births
Living people